Rożyńsk (1938–45 ) is a village in the administrative district of Gmina Ełk, within Ełk County, Warmian-Masurian Voivodeship, in northern Poland.

The village has a population of 180.

Climate
Rożyńsk has a humid continental climate. It is characterized by cold winters and fairly warm summers. The Köppen Climate Classification subtype for this climate is "Dfb". (Warm Summer Continental Climate).

References

Villages in Ełk County